Bygones is an Anglia Television documentary series exploring East Anglian history and traditional rural crafts first aired in 1967. The series, and in particular the regular Bygones Specials featured many interviews with people who used to do traditional work now lost to history (such as using a horse-drawn plough or threshing) and investigation and preservation of surviving East Anglian culture.

Bygones was presented by Dick Joice from 1967 until his retirement in 1987 when the film historian John Huntley took over. It was made by the Norwich-based television company Anglia for the ITV network. The series was discontinued in 1989, but briefly brought back by Anglia TV in 2007 following an overwhelming vote from viewers on a programme they wanted reinstated.

It features mystery objects where the audience are asked to write in and guess what the implement's original function was.  Dick Joice's collection of objects which featured in Bygones has been on display at Holkham Hall, Norfolk since 1979, in what was once the stables.

Some of the most memorable editions of Bygones are documentaries directed by Geoffrey Weaver.  "The Harvest" authentically re-created a harvest field around the turn of the 20th century, while "Gone For a Burton" followed the seasonal trip of East Anglian agricultural workers to work in the Burton upon Trent maltings after the hay and grain harvests.

Bygones has a distinctive theme tune played on a player piano (not a barrel organ), and for its 2007 revival was presented by Eddie Anderson, the former assistant of the original presenter Dick Joice, and Wendy Hurrell. Antique dealer Alan Smith often presents a section as well.

References

External links
http://www.itv.com/tvguide/
http://www.oldpond.com/acatalog/dick_joice.htm

1960s British documentary television series
1967 British television series debuts
1970s British documentary television series
1980s British documentary television series
1989 British television series endings
ITV documentaries
Television series by ITV Studios
English-language television shows
Television shows produced by Anglia Television